Wetmorena is a genus of diploglossid lizards endemic to the island of Hispaniola in the Caribbean, occurring in both the Dominican Republic and Haiti.

Taxonomy
There are two species, both of which were formerly classified in the genus Celestus until the genus Wetmorena was revived for them in 2021.

Conservation
Both species in the genus are endangered.

Etymology
The genus was named after American ornithologist Alexander Wetmore.

Species 

 Wetmorena agasepsoides  – serpentine four-toed galliwasp
 Wetmorena haetiana  – Hispaniolan earless galliwasp or earless galliwasp

References 

Wetmorena
Lizard genera
Taxa named by Doris Mable Cochran
Lizards of the Caribbean
Endemic fauna of Hispaniola